Heartache may refer to:

 Lovesickness, a condition involving romantic obsession or longing
 A broken heart or heartbreak, emotions after loss, disappointment or relationship break-up

Music

Albums
 Heart Ache, a 2004 EP by Jesu
 Heartache (Erykah Badu album)
 Heartache (Kit Chan album)
 Heartaches (Patsy Cline album), a 1985 compilation album  
 Heartaches (Dexter Gordon album)

Songs
 "Heartaches" (song), a 1931 song by Al Hoffman and John Clenner
 "Heartache", a single released in 1986 by Pepsi & Shirlie
 "Heartache", a song by Converge from No Heroes
 "Heartache", a song by Rock Goddess from Rock Goddess
 "Heartache", a track from the soundtrack of the 2015 video game Undertale by Toby Fox
 "Heartache", a song by ONE OK ROCK from 35xxxv
 "Heartache", a song by Relient K from Air for Free
 "Heartache", a song by Stephanie Mills from Something Real

Other media
 Heartaches (1916 film), an American silent film
 Heartaches (1947 film), an American crime film
 Heartaches (1981 film), 1981 movie with Margot Kidder

See also
 
 Heartbreak (disambiguation)
 Heart attack (disambiguation)
 Herzeleid, an album by Rammstein